The Suppliant Maidens may refer to:
 The Suppliants (Aeschylus) by Aeschylus, an ancient Greek play where the Danaides seek protection from King Pelasgus
 The Suppliants (Euripides) by Euripides, an ancient Greek play where the mothers of the Seven Against Thebes seek help from Theseus to bury their sons